Edmundo Donato (1925-1999) was a popular Brazilian writer, whose pseudonym is Marcos Rey. He was born in São Paulo city, state of São Paulo, in 1925. His brother Mário Donato is also a writer. He started writing short stories when he was sixteen years old. His first book is a novella which is called Um Gato no Triângulo, in 1953. He died in 1999 due to complications from a surgery.

Bibliography 

 Um Gato no Triângulo, novel, 1953
 O Mistério do Cinco Estrelas,  novel
 O Rapto do Garoto de Ouro, novel
 Um Cadáver Ouve Rádio, novel
 Sozinha no Mundo, novel
 Dinheiro do Céu, novel

External links
 Marcos Rey (Official Page) (in Portuguese)

1925 births
1999 deaths
Writers from São Paulo
Brazilian male novelists
20th-century Brazilian novelists
20th-century Brazilian male writers